Ashleigh Barty and CoCo Vandeweghe were the defending champions, but Vandeweghe could not participate due to injury. Barty played alongside Victoria Azarenka, but lost in the semifinals to Elise Mertens and Aryna Sabalenka.

Mertens and Sabalenka went on to win the title and completed the Sunshine Double, defeating Samantha Stosur and Zhang Shuai in the final, 7–6(7–5), 6–2.

Seeds

Draw

Finals

Top half

Bottom half

References

External links
 Main draw

Miami Open - Women's Doubles
2019 Miami Open